John Merit Woitt (born June 29, 1946) is a former American football defensive back who played for the San Francisco 49ers in the National Football League (NFL). He played college football at Mississippi State University.

College career 
Woitt played college at Mississippi State. Woitt played running back in college. In his senior year, he ran 3 times for 60 yards. He also caught 8 passes for 82 yards and 2 touchdowns.

Professional career 
Woitt signed with the San Francisco 49ers as an undrafted free agent in 1968 and he was converted to a defensive back. In his rookie season, he played all 14 games and recovered 1 fumble. He remained with the 49ers for his second year. In his second year, he was a bit more involved and was a starter for 4 games. In week six of the season against the Baltimore Colts, he picked off the quarterback for a 57-yard touchdown in the 24-21 victory.

References 

1946 births
Living people
American football defensive backs
Mississippi State Bulldogs football players
San Francisco 49ers players